Don Enrique Pérez de Guzmán y Fernández de Velasco, 4th Duke of Medina Sidonia (died 1512) was the son of Juan Alfonso Pérez de Guzmán, 3rd Duke of Medina Sidonia.  He was Duke of Medina Sidonia from 1507. No issue by his wife María Téllez Girón.

1512 deaths
Year of birth unknown
Dukes of Medina Sidonia